AI Velorum is a variable star in the southern constellation of Vela, abbreviated AI Vel. It is a prototype for a class of high amplitude Delta Scuti variables. The apparent visual magnitude of this star fluctuates around 6.56, which is just bright enough to be dimly visible to the naked eye. The distance to AI Vel is approximately 327 light years based on parallax measurements, and it is drifting further away with a radial velocity of about 9 km/s.

The variability of this star was announced by E. Hertzsprung in 1931. In 1937, F. Zagar found irregular variations in the light curve. T. Walraven classified it as an RR Lyrae star in 1952 and suggested it may have two periods that interfered with each other. The height of the maximum was found to be greater than the depth of the minimum, which may be the result of shockwaves that increase light emission.

As an RR Lyrae variable, AI Velorum should be a low mass, evolved star. However, M. Breger in 1977 noted the period and surface gravity showed a match with Delta Scuti stars of the same period. Together with the space velocity, these indicated it is instead a normal, high mass star belonging to the younger population I. By 1985, there was some evidence for an increase in the second period by one part in 105. At least two additional periodicities were identified by Walraven and associates in 1992.

The stellar classification of AI Vel is A9IV/V, matching a slightly evolved star that is moving away from the main sequence. It is 479 million years old and is estimated to have 1.55 times the mass of the Sun. As a Delta Scuti variable, the brightness of the star ranges in magnitude from 6.15 down to 6.76.  Evolutionary models published with Gaia Data Release 3 show it to be approaching the end of its main sequence life.

References

Further reading

A-type main-sequence stars
A-type subgiants
Delta Scuti variables
Vela (constellation)
Durchmusterung objects
069213
040330
Velorum, AI